The Atlanta Dogwood Festival is an arts and crafts festival held each spring at Piedmont Park in Atlanta, Georgia, established in 1933. Originally held for nine days across two weekends and the weekdays between, it is now held only one weekend during early April, when the native flowering dogwood trees are in bloom.

There was no festival in 1942–45 nor 2020.

External links 

 Atlanta Dogwood Festival website

Dogwood festivals
Festivals in Atlanta